Anđušić is a Serbian surname. Notable people with the surname include:

Danilo Anđušić (born 1991), Serbian basketball player
Dražen Anđušić (born 1993), Montenegrin footballer

Serbian surnames